Hymned, No. 1 (sometimes simply called Hymned) is the first solo album from MercyMe singer Bart Millard. The album features modern takes on popular Christian hymns. The album was released on August 16, 2005.

Millard has said that the album is inspired by hymns his grandmother, Ruby Lindsey, used to sing when he was a boy.

Track listing

 "Just a Closer Walk with Thee" - 4:57
 "Mawmaw's Song (In the Sweet By and By)" (Graul, Millard) - 4:10
 "Pass Me Not, O Gentle Saviour" (featuring Vince Gill) (Francis J. Crosby, William H. Doane) - 3:53
 "Have a Little Talk with Jesus" (Cleavant Derricks) - 4:10
 "Precious Lord, Take My Hand" (Thomas A. Dorsey) - 4:19
 "Softly and Tenderly" (Will Lamartine Thompson) - 4:04
 "Sweetest Name I Know" (Luther B. Bridgers) - 4:03
 "Power in the Blood" (Lewis E. Jones) - 3:42
 "My Jesus I Love Thee"/"'Tis So Sweet" (William Ralph Featherston, Gordon, Kirkpatrick, Stead) - 4:28
 "The Old Rugged Cross" (George Bennard) - 4:23

Chart performance

The album peaked at #12 on Billboard'''s Christian Albums and #13 on Billboard's Heatseekers Albums.

Awards

In 2006, the album won a Dove Award for Inspirational Album of the Year at the 37th GMA Dove Awards in a tie with Amy Grant's Rock of Ages... Hymns and Faith''.

Charts

References

External links
Hymned, No. 1 at Amazon.com

2005 albums